Ann M. Williams (born 1968) is a Democratic member of the Illinois House of Representatives who has represented the 11th District since 2011. The district includes the Chicago neighborhoods of West Lakeview, Roscoe Village and North Center, as well as parts of Lincoln Park and Lincoln Square.

Education and career
Williams received a Bachelor of Arts in Journalism from the University of Iowa in 1992 and a Juris Doctor from Drake University in 1994. As an attorney, she served as Assistant Attorney General in the office of Illinois Attorney General Lisa Madigan.

State Representative
Williams was elected to her first term as state representative of Illinois' 11th District in 2010 to replace John Fritchey who chose to run for a seat on the Cook County Board of Commissioners.  Williams was supported by both of Chicago's major newspapers.  The Chicago Tribune noted in its endorsement that "It's good to see that she believes party leaders shouldn't be exempt from the new campaign contribution caps imposed on everyone else." The Chicago Sun-Times called her "bright and conscientious" and noted her work for Attorney General Lisa Madigan and as a staff attorney for the state House. Williams focused her campaign on protecting women and children from sex offenders, fighting for greater access to affordable healthcare, and making government open and accountable to the people. Her Committee assignments include Judiciary I - Civil Law; Consumer Protection; Adoption Reform; Business Occupational Licenses; Environmental Health; and Government Operations Subcommittee.

Williams won reelection to a second term in 2012. She ran unopposed in the March 20 Democratic primary and was unopposed in the general election, which took place on November 6, 2012. Williams was re-elected to a third term in November 2014.

In 2018, J.B. Pritzker appointed Williams to Powering Illinois’ Future transition committee, which is responsible for infrastructure and clean energy policies.

Williams is pro-choice and favors the legalization of same-sex marriage. She was a co-sponsor of the bill legalizing same-sex marriage in Illinois. Williams was the only Chicago lawmaker in the Illinois House to vote against a bill supported by Chicago Mayor Rahm Emanuel allowing speed-detection cameras near schools and parks throughout the city.

As of July 3, 2022, Representative Williams is a member of the following Illinois House committees:

 Civil Procedure & Tort Liability Subcommittee (HJUA-CIVI)
 Commercial Property Subcommittee (HJUA-COMM)
 (chairwoman of) Energy & Environment Committee (HENG)
 Ethics & Elections Committee (SHEE)
 Judiciary - Civil Committee (HJUA)
 Lobbying Subcommittee (SHEE-LOBY)
 Small Business, Tech Innovation, and Entrepreneurship Committee (SBTE)
 Tourism Committee (SHTO)

Electoral history

References

External links
Representative Ann Williams (D) 11th District at the Illinois General Assembly
By session: 100th, 99th, 98th, 97th
State Representative Ann Williams constituency website
Ann Williams for State Representative
 
Ann Williams at Illinois House Democrats

1968 births
21st-century American politicians
21st-century American women politicians
American women lawyers
Living people
Democratic Party members of the Illinois House of Representatives
Politicians from Chicago
University of Iowa alumni
Women state legislators in Illinois
Drake University Law School alumni